may refer to:

 Aoba-ku, Yokohama, in Japan
 Aoba-ku, Sendai, in Japan